The Cape Town International Challenge was an international tournament which took place in April 2010. The competition was created by the South African Football Association to try out the new infrastructure in time for the 2010 FIFA World Cup.  The competition was won by the Nigerian under 20 national football team.

References 

2010
2009–10 in South African soccer
2009–10 in Ghanaian football
2010 in Brazilian football
2009–10 in Nigerian football